State Route 77 (abbreviated SR 77) is part of Maine's system of numbered state highways, located in eastern Cumberland County.

Route description

SR 77 begins in Scarborough at SR 207 near Scarborough Beach State Park.  It runs east and north along the coastline, through the town of Cape Elizabeth. SR 77 passes through eastern South Portland before crossing the Fore River on the Casco Bay Bridge into downtown Portland.

Upon entering Portland proper, SR 77 crosses over U.S. Route 1A (US 1A) with indirect access available via connecting streets.  The highway splits into a one-way pair, High Street northbound and State Street southbound.  The SR 77 designation continues north for another  before terminating at Park Street.  This intersection is the signed eastern terminus of SR 22, and administratively SR 25, although the latter is not signed. In addition, the highway also passes Cumberland Street just to the south, the former southern terminus of SR 26. The one-way northbound alignment of SR 77 on High Street is not officially part of the route as designated, because State Street was formerly a two-way street (prior to the 1990s).

Junction list

References

External links

Floodgap Roadgap's RoadsAroundME: Maine State Route 77

077
Transportation in Cumberland County, Maine